Sousse or Soussa (Berber:Susa) is a city in Tunisia, capital of the Sousse Governorate. Sousse is in the central-east of the country, on the Gulf of Hammamet, which is a part of the Mediterranean Sea. Its economy is based on transport equipment, processed food, olive oil, textiles, and tourism. It is home to the Université de Sousse.

Toponymy
Sousse and Soussa are both French spellings of the Arabic name Sūsa, which may derive from Berber (cf., e.g., Morocco's Sous River and Region). The present city has also grown to include the ruins of Hadrumetum, which had many names in several languages during antiquity.

Geography

Sousse is in the center of Tunisia, on the Tunisian Sahel coast and on the Mediterranean Sea bordering the east of the country. The city covers 45 km2 and is 25 meters above sea level.

Sousse is between two wadis: the Wadi Bliban (and its tributary the Wadi al-Kharrub) to the north and northwest and the Wadi al-Halluf to the southeast. The subsoil is mostly sedimentary with some deep alluvial deposits, which are more recent closer to the coast. Winters are generally mild, there is an average of 69 days of rainfall per year, and there is a lot of sunshine year-round with relatively few cloudy days.

Administration 
The Municipality of Sousse is the capital of a governorate that extends over 2669. It is divided into four municipal districts: Sousse Nord, Sousse Sud, Sousse Médina and Sousse Riadh. The first two were created on 11 February 1976 and the last two on 19 February 1982. Its main constituencies and Delegation are four in number: Sousse Sidi Abdelhamid, Sousse Médina, Sousse Jawhara and Sousse Riadh. Its geographic code is 31.

History

Hadrumetum

In the 11th centuryBC, Tyrians established Hadrumetum as a trading post and waypoint along their trade routes to Italy and the Strait of Gibraltar.

The city featured in the Third Sicilian War, the Second and Third Punic Wars (in the latter of which it secured additional territory and special privileges by aiding Rome against what was left of the Carthaginians), and Caesar's Civil War, when it was the scene of Caesar's famously deft recovery: upon tripping while coming ashore, he dealt with the poor omen this threatened to become by grabbing handfuls of dirt and proclaiming "I have you now, Africa!" The second city in Roman Africa after Carthage, it became the capital of the province of Byzacena during the Diocletianic Reforms. Its native sons included the jurist Salvius Julianus, the emperor Clodius Albinus, and numerous Christian saints. The Roman and Byzantine catacombs beneath the city are extensive.

The Vandals sacked Hadrumetum in 434 but it remained a place of importance within their kingdom; a bishop and proconsul were martyred there during the Vandals' periodic forced conversions of their subjects to Arianism. The Byzantine Empire reconquered the town in 534 during the Vandal War and engaged in a public works program that included new fortifications and churches. The town was sacked during the Umayyad Caliphate's 7th-century conquest of North Africa. According to a 1987 ICOMOS report, Uqba ibn Nafi's siege and capture of the city resulted in its almost complete destruction, such that no monument of Hadrumetum "subsists in situ".

Medieval Susa
Muslim Arab armies rapidly spread Arab culture across what had been a thoroughly Romanized and Christianized landscape. Under the Aghlabids, Susa was established near the ruins of Hadrumetum and served as their main port. Their 827 invasion of Sicily was mainly launched from the town's harbor. After the Byzantine city of Melite (modern Mdina on Malta) was captured by the Aghlabids in 870, marble from its churches was used to build the Ribat. A soaring structure that combined the purposes of a minaret and a watch tower, it remains in outstanding condition and draws visitors from around the world. Its mosque is sometimes accounted the oldest surviving in the region and the town's main mosque, also built during the 9th century, has a similarly fortress-like appearance.

Susa was briefly occupied by Norman Sicily in the 12th century; it fell to the Ottoman Empire in the 16th; and it was bombarded by a French and Venetian fleet in the 18th.

Medieval Susa was known for its textile industries, producing silk and flax fabrics called Sūsī. Especially renowned were its robes called , some of which were mass-produced and sold ready-to-wear throughout the Mediterranean.

After the decline of Mahdia in the 15th and 16th centuries, Susa remained as the most important town in the Sahel region, with a population of about 15,000.

Colonial Sousse
Tunisia became a French protectorate in 1881. Around the end of the 19th century, Sousse had a population of 7,000 and was the second-most-important city in Tunisia after Tunis itself. At this point, the entire population of Sousse lived in the walled medina. The medina was surrounded by agricultural settlements, two of which - Kala Kebira and Msaken - were more densely populated than the city itself. The French Protectorate reinforced Sousse's role as a commercial and administrative center by establishing public buildings, enlarging the city's port, and building railways. Between 1896 and 1911, railways were built connecting Sousse with Tunis, Kairouan, Sfax, Mahdia, Moknin, and Henshir Suwatir. Food industries were also established in the city.

Before the First World War, Sousse had about 25,000 inhabitants, including around 10,000 French and roughly 5,000 other Europeans, mostly Italians and Maltese. The port was the garrison of the 4th Tunisian Rifle Regiment.

The first developments outside the medina walls were begun during this period, but they were home to a relatively small number of people until after the Second World War. Sousse was devastated by the war and suffered 39 bombardments between December 1942 and May 1943. In 1946, after the war was over, the authorities decided to give a high priority to reconstruction efforts in Sousse.

Modern Sousse
When Tunisia became independent in 1956, Sousse was made a wilayah capital and it continued to expand in all directions. Over the course of the 20th century, its growth was explosive: from just 8,577 residents in 1885, it had grown to 134,835 residents in 1994. Its physical area had also increased massively, from a compact 29 hectares in 1881 to 3,100 hectares in 1992. The secondary and tertiary sectors of the economy also grew accordingly.

Sousse has retained the Arabian look and feel it assumed in the centuries after its initial conquest. Today it is considered one of the best examples of seaward-facing fortifications built by the Arabs. With a population of about 200,000, Sousse retains a medieval heart of narrow, twisted streets, a kasbah and medina, its ribat fortress and long wall on the Mediterranean. Surrounding it is a modern city of long, straight roads and more widely spaced buildings.

Sousse was the site of the chess interzonal in 1967, made famous when American Grandmaster Bobby Fischer withdrew from the tournament even though he was in first place at the time.

On 26 June 2015, a lone gunman, Seifeddine Rezgui Yacoubi, opened fire on tourists sunbathing on a beach near the Riu Imperial Marhaba and Soviva hotels, killing 38 and wounding 39, before being shot dead by the police.

Cityscape

Demography 

As of 2019, Sousse's population was 737,027. Males represent 50.1% of the population structure (with a population of 509,456) against 49.9% by females (with a population of 507,426) in 2014.

Public services

The city contains the University of Sousse, formerly known as the University of the Center, including its Ibn El Jazzar, Faculty of Medicine, the Sousse National School of Engineers, and the Higher Institute of Music of Sousse, founded in 1999.

There are a number of high schools, such as the pilot high school of Sousse, the boys' high school, the Tahar-Sfar high school (formerly the young girls' high school), the 20 – March 1934 high school (technical high school), the Abdelaziz-El-Bahi high school or the Jawhara high school, and colleges, such as the Pilot College of Sousse, the Mohamed El Aroui College and the Constantine College.

Sousse is served by a hospital, the Hospital of Sahloul, the largest in the region.

Economy

Sousse's most important economic activity takes place in the tertiary sector, which employs over 50% of the city's workforce and includes administration, education, healthcare, trade, communications, and banking. Not far behind is the secondary sector, which employs another 45% of the city's workers and includes industries like textiles and leather, construction, chemicals, electronics, and mechanical and electrical components. The small remainder is engaged in the primary sector, mainly fishing. Although smaller than the port in Sfax, Sousse has a port that serves an important commercial outlet for central Tunisia, particularly for the regions around Kairouan and Kasserine.

Sousse is the third largest city in Tunisia after Tunis and Sfax. Although it is associated with olive oil manufacture and has other industries, tourism predominates today. An olive grove covering more than  constitutes one of its main riches since antiquity. The busy port near downtown adds a touch of liveliness to its activity. Sousse also had many oil wells in the area during its colonial period.

Tourism
Sousse is an important tourist resort. It has a hot semi-arid climate, with the seaside location moderating the climate, making it an all-season resort with hot, dry summers and warm, mild, wet winters. The fine sandy beaches are backed by orchards and olive groves.

Only  from Monastir and Monastir Habib Bourguiba International Airport, hotel complexes with a capacity of 40,000 beds extend  from the old city (medina) north along the seafront to Port El Kantaoui. Some 1,200,000 visitors come every year to enjoy its hotels and restaurants, nightclubs, casinos, beaches, and sports facilities.

Sousse is considered a popular tourist destination, especially due to its nightlife. Well-known nightclubs include Bora Bora, Living, Rediguana, Platinum, and The Saloon. The top producers and DJs in dance come to play at the various clubs. The season traditionally begins at the start of June and finishes on the first weekend of October with the closing parties.

Transport

Sousse is well-connected with the main Tunisian Railways network, having non-electrified lines to Tunis (since 1899), Sfax (since 1911), and Kasserine (since 2004) with diesel multiple unit and locomotive-driven trains. The main Gare Sousse terminus is in the city center, while Gare Kalaa Seghira serves a bypass route.

Since 2010 the electrified Sahel Metro line goes south to Monastir Habib Bourguiba International Airport, Monastir, and Mahdia. This line has the Sousse - Bab Jadid station as its northern terminus in Sousse's city center, and 4 additional stations in the city.

Intercity buses and red-strip microbuses (so-called louages) connect Sousse with many cities in Tunisia. Urban transit in Sousse is served by routes of articulated and conventional buses, blue-strip louages, and cheap taxis.
The  Sousse–Kairouan Decauville railway operated from 1882 to 1996, before it was regauged to  gauge.

Sights

Medina 

A medina, surrounded by its city walls and fortifications, is of historical interest. The medina includes open and covered bazaars (souks). Buildings of historical interest include the ribat castle, the central mosque, and a historical museum in the Casbah with mosaics from the area's many Roman villas. The Carthaginian catacombs can be visited.

UNESCO declared the medina of Sousse a World Heritage Site in 1988, citing among various things its preservation from modern development.

Port Kantaoui 

The Kantaoui Port, is a touristic station in the form of a Port. It was built in 1979 specifically as a tourist center.

The architecture, although modern and dazzlingly white, has been modeled on the more traditional buildings in Tunisia, complete with narrow streets and arches. The hotels that line the beachfront extend from Sousse itself along miles of sparkling clean sea to the harbor of Port El Kantaoui and to the north of the harbor.

Religious buildings

Great Mosque 

Located at the entrance to the medina, it was erected by the Aghlabid sovereign Aboul Abbas I (841–856) in 850–851, almost thirty years after the construction of the Ribat of Sousse. This mosque is the most emblematic of a city that became a few years after the reign of Ziadet-Allah I (817–838), the second city of Ifriqiya and the Sahel. Subsequently, the building is enlarged during the reign of Ibrahim II (875–902).

Other religious sights 
 Bou Ftetah Mosque
 Médersa El Zaqqaq
 Église Saint-Félix

Sport 

Sousse is represented by Étoile Sportive du Sahel, a large multisport club. Football is the city's most popular sport, and ES Sahel has won the Tunisian football championship ten times and the Tunisian Cup ten times. The team's home ground is Stade Olympique de Sousse. Handball, basketball, and volleyball are also popular.

Climate
Köppen-Geiger climate classification system classifies Sousse's climate as hot semi-arid (BSh) bordering with hot-summer Mediterranean (Csa) and cool semi-arid (BSk).

Notable people
 Salvius Julianus or Julian the Jurist, a master jurist, public official, and politician who served in the Roman imperial state under four successive emperors.
 Primasius of Hadrumetum, Roman bishop and exegete, noted for his Commentary on the Apocalypse
 Mohamed Ghannouchi, former prime minister
 Hamadi Jebali, former prime minister
 Aymen Abdennour, footballer
 Makrem Ben Romdhane, basketball player
 Dov Alfon, author and journalist
 Marcel Dadi, guitarist who died in the TWA accident of 1996.
 Zine El Abidine Ben Ali former President

In films
Sousse's old city has aspects that made it an ideal film location. Most famous is Raiders of the Lost Ark (1981), where Sousse represents Cairo, though its architectural style, white-washed houses with blue details, bears no resemblance to Cairo's.

Twin towns – sister cities

Sousse is twinned with:

 Boulogne-Billancourt, France
 Braunschweig, Germany
 Constantine, Algeria
 İzmir, Turkey
 Latakia, Syria
 Ljubljana, Slovenia
 Marrakesh, Morocco
 Nice, France
 Thiès, Senegal
 Weihai, China

Gallery

References

Further reading
.

.

External links
Official:

 > 'Sousse Patrimoine Mondial de l'humanité' and 'Sousse dans l'histoire'

General references and travel guides:

Interactive Virtual Tour of Sousse

Photographs:

 Photo Gallery of Sousse by a Tourist 2010 Winter

Cities in Tunisia
Archaeological sites in Tunisia
Communes of Tunisia
Seaside resorts in Tunisia
Mediterranean port cities and towns in Tunisia
Ports and harbours of the Arab League
Transport in the Arab League
Sousse Governorate